Hermann Lindemann (29 October 191023 July 2002) was a German football player and later manager. He played for a number of German club sides, before participating in an all-star team tour of Iceland in the summer of 1938 while playing as a striker for Eintracht Frankfurt. During the trip he was invited to coach the Icelandic side Fram. His managing career continued at Borussia Dortmund, which he managed from 1969 to 70. He was inducted into the Fram Hall of Fame for helping the club in 1939 win its first champions title in Úrvalsdeild for fourteen years.

References

External links 
 In memoriam – Hermann Lindemann (German)

1910 births
2002 deaths
People from Hersfeld-Rotenburg
Sportspeople from Kassel (region)
German footballers
FSV Frankfurt players
1. FC Lokomotive Leipzig players
Kickers Offenbach players
Eintracht Frankfurt players
VfL Germania 1894 players
German football managers
Knattspyrnufélagið Fram managers
Alemannia Aachen managers
MSV Duisburg managers
Fortuna Düsseldorf managers
Eintracht Braunschweig managers
VfL Bochum managers
SC Young Fellows Juventus managers
Borussia Dortmund managers
Bundesliga managers
Association football defenders
Footballers from Hesse
German expatriate football managers
West German football managers
West German expatriate football managers
German expatriate sportspeople in Iceland
West German expatriate sportspeople in Switzerland
Expatriate football managers in Iceland
Expatriate football managers in Switzerland